The European Journal of Immunology is an academic journal of the European Federation of Immunological Societies covering  basic immunology research, with a primary focus on antigen processing, cellular immune response, immunity to infection, immunomodulation, leukocyte signalling, clinical immunology, innate immunity, molecular immunology, and related new technology.

The editor-in-chief is James Di Santo. According to the Journal Citation Reports, the journal had a 2020 impact factor of 5.532.

Professionals in the fields of immunology, biochemistry, infection, oncology, hematology, cell biology, rheumatology, endocrinology and molecular biology make up the journal's readership.

References

External links 
 

Biology in Europe
Publications established in 1971
English-language journals
Monthly journals
Academic journals associated with international learned and professional societies of Europe
Wiley-VCH academic journals
Immunology journals